Pyrrhia bifaciata is a moth of the family Noctuidae. It is found in China, Japan (Hokkaido, Honshu and Shikoku), the Russian Far East (the Primorye region,  the Amur region, southern Khabarovsk and southern Sakhalin), Taiwan and on the Korean Peninsula

External links
Insects of Korea

Heliothinae